Jaime Staples (born May 27, 1991) is a poker player from Alberta, Canada who specializes in live streaming of online multi-table tournaments on Twitch. With over 112,000 followers on Twitch, Jaime is one of the biggest poker streamers, behind Jason Somerville, in 2016. He primarily plays on Party Poker after becoming a Party Poker Pro on 4 May 2019. Jaime was previously sponsored by Poker Stars the number 1 poker site but joined their rivals as it gave him the opportunity to make a "better and more positive impact on the online poker community". Since joining Stake Kings in October 2015 he regularly sells action for tournaments he streams on Twitch which allows his viewers to "share the sweat."

Staples first entered the public eye as a guest on the Badugi All-Stars podcast. In September 2016, Staples moved from his home city of Calgary, Alberta, then to Montreal, Quebec, along with his brother Matt and his good friend, Big Brother Canada contestant Kevin Martin. All three stream poker regularly on Twitch.  Jaime has streamed from various locations around the world, including Canada, Croatia, Wales, British Virgin Islands, Costa Rica, Germany, Scotland, England, Iceland and Malta. He is currently streaming from Edinburgh, Scotland.

As of 2020, his online tournament net cashes exceed $1,000,000. Jaime concentrates on streaming rather than live tournaments.

Personal life

Birthed with the name James Staples, as of August 2016, he began daily vlogging, documenting various minutiae of life as a poker player, as well as his attempts to lose weight and quit smoking.

Jaime got engaged to his long term girlfriend Rebecca Hardisty on 22 November 2018.  Jaime and Rebecca met due to their shared love of online poker.

Jaime Staples is the oldest of four siblings; Chris Staples, Matt Staples and Amy Staples. On March 25, 2018, Jamie and his brother Matt won a $150,000 prop bet with Bill Perkins by weighing within one pound of each other precisely a year after the commencement of the bet.

References

External links
 
 Jaime Staples on Twitch
 Jaime Staples Hendon Mob profile
 Jaime Staples Interview

1991 births
Canadian poker players
Twitch (service) streamers
Living people
People from Calgary